Azizi-ye Olya (also Romanized as Azīzī-ye ‘Olyā and ‘Azīzī ‘Olyā; also known as ‘Azīzī and ‘Azīzī-ye Bālā) is a village in Sarfaryab Rural District, Sarfaryab District, Charam County, Kohgiluyeh and Boyer-Ahmad Province, Iran. At the 2006 census, its population was 46, in 9 families.

References 

Populated places in Charam County